The Shag Rocks are six small islets, as opposed to islands, in the westernmost extreme of South Georgia,   west of the main island of South Georgia and  off the Falkland Islands.

Temperatures average , rarely climbing above . There is no significant vegetation, but the rocks are covered by the guano of seabirds. The main wildlife found on the rocks are the South Georgia shags, prions and wandering albatrosses.

History 
The Shag Rocks were discovered by Jose de la Llana in 1762 with the Spanish ship Aurora, and originally named the Aurora Islands, after his ship. They were visited by the Spanish ship San Miguel in 1769, again by the Aurora in 1774, and in 1779 by the Princesa and the Dolores. In 1794 the Auroras were finally mapped by the Spanish corvette Atrevida. However, the Aurora Islands are considered by many to have been a mistaken sighting that was coincidentally near the Shag Rocks, which were known to sealers prior to 1823. They were later rediscovered by James P. Sheffield and given their current name, probably because shags and other seabirds frequent them. They were charted by Discovery Investigations personnel on the William Scoresby in 1927. The first known landing was made in 1956 when Argentine geologist Mario Giovinetto was lowered from a helicopter to collect rock samples.

Government 
The Shag Rocks form part of the British overseas territory of South Georgia and the South Sandwich Islands.  Before 1985 they came within the Falkland Islands Dependencies.

Argentina lays claim to the Shag Rocks and Black Rock. Black Rock and Shag Rocks are on the route from the Falkland Islands to South Georgia Island, on a seamount of Scotia Ridge.

Britain in 1985 formed its overseas territory of South Georgia and the South Sandwich Islands, which includes Black Rock and Shag Rocks. It now assumes responsibility for preservation and defence of the area.

See also 
 Composite Antarctic Gazetteer
 History of South Georgia and the South Sandwich Islands
 List of Antarctic and sub-Antarctic islands
 List of Antarctic islands north of 60° S
 Rockall

References

External links 
CIA World Factbook Entry South Georgia
The Shag Rocks, South Atlantic Ocean at Britlink.
ONC U-19 South Georgia; South Sandwich Islands (map including the Shag Rocks)

Uninhabited islands of South Georgia and the South Sandwich Islands
Islands of South Georgia